Neodendragonum is a genus of ground beetles in the family Carabidae. There are at least two described species in Neodendragonum.

Species
These two species belong to the genus Neodendragonum:
 Neodendragonum laurenti (Basilewsky, 1950)  (Democratic Republic of the Congo and Rwanda)
 Neodendragonum leleupi (Basilewsky, 1950)  (Democratic Republic of the Congo)

References

Platyninae